Sickness of the Ages is the first full-length album by the hardcore/thrash band I Hate Sally.

Track listing
"Intro" - 0:13
"Clean Up The Blood" - 2:24
"Crushed Against The Grain" - 3:38
"Iron Fist" - 7:37
"Sickness Of The Ages" - 5:43
"Under The Ribs Of Death" - 4:56
"In The Name Of Democracy" - 5:38
"Root Of All Evil" - 3:40
"This Must Be Hell" - 6:06
"Wake Up Screaming" - 6:37

I Hate Sally albums
2004 albums